The BRM P153 was a Formula One racing car designed by Tony Southgate for the British Racing Motors team, which raced in the ,  and 1972 Formula One seasons. It was powered by a 3.0-litre V12 engine. Its best result was victory at the 1970 Belgian Grand Prix, where Pedro Rodríguez beat the second-placed March of Chris Amon by just 1.1 seconds. The model was first shown in BRM's traditional British racing green, but by the time it appeared on the race tracks it was in the colours of the team's sponsor, Yardley of London.

Engine 
In contrast to the other British teams, amongst whom the Cosworth DFV V8 had become nearly ubiquitous, BRM chose a different route for the P153's engine. Magneti Marelli supplied their Dinoplex ignition system, and Lucas provided mechanical fuel injection.

Gearbox 

Its gearbox was a sequential BRM P151 type with 5-speeds with reverse, which was connected to the engine by a Borg & Beck clutch.

Chassis 
It had an aluminium monocoque with tubular support attached to the engine. Its total weight was 535kg.

Complete Formula One World Championship results 
(key) (results in bold indicate pole position; results in italics indicate fastest lap)

 All points scored by the BRM P160. All points scored by the BRM P160s.

References

BRM Formula One cars
1970 Formula One season cars
1971 Formula One season cars
1972 Formula One season cars